The following is a list of notable Kuwaitis:

Ruling family

House of Al Sabah
 Abdullah III Al-Salim Al-Sabah
 Ahmad Al-Jaber Al-Sabah
 Jaber Al-Ahmad Al-Jaber Al-Sabah — former Emir of Kuwait
 Mohammad Sabah Al-Salem Al-Sabah
 Mubarak Al-Sabah
 Muhammad I Al Sabah
 Nasser Al-Mohammed Al-Ahmed Al-Sabah
 Nasser Sabah Al-Ahmed Al-Sabah
Nawaf Al-Ahmad Al-Jaber Al-Sabah — current Emir of Kuwait
 Saad Al-Abdullah Al-Salim Al-Sabah
 Sabah I bin Jaber — born c. 1700, first ruler of Kuwait
 Sabah Al-Ahmad Al-Jaber Al-Sabah — former Emir of Kuwait
 Sabah III Al-Salim Al-Sabah
 Salem Al-Ali A-Sabah
 Salem Sabah Al-Salem Al-Sabah
 Salim Al-Mubarak Al-Sabah

Politics

 Alaa Hussein Ali
 Ahmed Al-Sadoun
 Rola Dashti
 Massouma al-Mubarak
 Bader Al-Nashi
 Ahmed al-Rubei
 Nabil Al Fadl
Members of the National Assembly
 Daifallah Bouramiya
 Hussain al-Qallaf
 Rija Hujailan Al-Mutairi
 Mohammed Hayef Al-Mutairi
 Adnan Zahid Abdulsamad
 Musallam Al-Barrak
 Marzouq Al-Ghanim
 Safa Al Hashem 
 Ibrahim Khraibut
 Mohammed Al-Abduljader
 Saleh Ashour
 Abdulwahed Al-Awadhi
 Aseel al-Awadhi
 Abdulatif Al-Ameeri
 Adel Al-Saraawi

Businesspeople

 Abdullah Saleh Al Mulla — Politician and founder of Al-Mulla Group
 Jassem Al Kharafi — Billionaire heir and politician 
 Nasser Al Kharafi — Former Chairman and President of M. A. Kharafi & Sons
 Abdullah Abdul Latif Al Othman — Businessman and philanthropist
 Fahad AlSharekh
 Yousuf Saleh Alyan — Founder and former editor-in-chief of Kuwait Times
 Fahed Boodai — Chairman and co-founder of Gatehouse Financial Group
 Fawaz Al Hasawi — Former owner of Nottingham Forest F.C.
 Maha Al Ghunaim — Co-founder of Global Investment House (GIH)
 Souad Al Humaidhi — Businesswoman
 Saad Bin Tefla — Businessman and politician
 Bader Nasser Al Kharafi — Vice Chairman and CEO, Zain Group
 Mohammad Al Duaij — CEO, Alea Global Group
 Nejoud Boodai — Fashion designer and businesswoman

Sports

 Fehaid Al Deehani
 Ali Mohamed Al-Zinkawi — Hammer thrower
 Mohammed al Ghareeb — Tennis player
 Zed Al Refai (Zeddy) — Climber
Soccer players
 Faisal Al-Dakhil
 Mohammed Ibrahem
 Ahmed Al-Tarabilsi
 Fayez Bandar
 Fathi Kamel
 Nawaf Al-Mutairi 
 Fahad Al-Rashidi
 Fawzi Al Shammari
 Nohair Al-Shammari
 Khaled Khalaf
 Abdullah Al-Buloushi
 Abdulaziz Al-Anberi
 Jamal Mubarak
 Jassem Al Houwaidi
 Bader Al-Mutwa
 Musaed Neda
 Jasem Yacob
 Wael Sulaiman Al-Habashi
 Ahmad Ajab
 Nawaf Mohammad Al-Otaibi

Arts

 Chelsea Abdullah — Novelist
 Abdallah Al Rowaished — Singer
 Bashar Al Shatty — Singer, musician, actor
 Amal Al-Awadhi — actress and TV presenter
 Thuraya Al-Baqsami — Artist and writer
 Mojeb al-Dousari
 Khalifa Alqattan — Artist
 Shemayel — Retired singer
 Iqbal al-Gharaballi — Novelist
 Nawal El Kuwaiti — Singer
 Zaid Al-Harb — Poet
 Ema Shah — Singer, musician, actress and dancer
 Hayat Al-Fahad — Actress, broadcaster, writer and producer
 Shujoun Al-Hajri — Actress and broadcaster

Others

 Ahmad Abdulal
 Ahmad Meshari Al-Adwani
 Dr. Abdul-Razzak Al-Adwani
 Abdul Rahman Al-Sumait
 Nabil Al Awadi
 Abdulhadi Al-Khayat
 Abdallah Saleh Ali Al Ajmi
 Ibrahim Al-Mudhaf
 Faiza Al-Kharafi 
 Abu Obeida Tawari al-Obeidi
 Abdullah Al-Refai
 Tareq Al-Suwaidan
 Sara Akbar
 Adil Zamil Abdull Mohssin Al Zamil
 Saad Madhi Saad Howash Al Azmi
 Abbas Almohri
 Fouzi Khalid Abdullah Al Awda
 Kazem Behbehani
 Ibtihal Al-Khatib

See also

 List of Kuwaitis by net worth
 List of people by nationality